La vaquilla (English: The Heifer) is a 1985 Spanish comedy film written and directed by Luis García Berlanga. It was the first comedy made about the Spanish Civil War and the highest-grossing Spanish film in Spain at the time surpassing Los santos inocentes.

Plot
During the Spanish Civil War on the Aragón frontline the speakers of the Nationalist troops announce a festival in a nearby village which includes a bull run and religious procession. A group of Republican soldiers infiltrate the Nationalist side to steal the animal for two reasons; to ruin the holiday for the Nationalists and because their food stores are low.

Characters
 Brigada Castro (Alfredo Landa), a professional Republican soldier.
 Mariano (Guillermo Montesinos), a Republican soldier coming from a village across the frontline, where his girlfriend Guadalupe remained.
 Limeño (Santiago Ramos), a Republican soldier who was a bullfighter before the war. Chosen to kill the heifer, he is actually afraid of bulls.
 Lieutenant Broseta (José Sacristán), a Republican officer who was a hairdresser before the war. He longs for his profession and threatens to punish failure with a complete head shave.
 Priest (Carles Velat), a Republican soldier who almost became a Catholic priest. He still remembers many mannerisms.
 Republican Colonel (Eduardo Calvo)
 Guadalupe (Violeta Cela), daughter of a Republican and girlfriend of the absent Republican Mariano, she is dating a  nationalist Alférez.
 Nationalist Commander (Agustín González), has to deal with his troops and the local aristocrats.
 Juana (María Luisa Ponte), mother of Guadalupe, has to hide her Republican husband.
 Alférez (Juanjo Puigcorbé), a Nationalist officer courting Guadalupe.
 The marquis (Adolfo Marsillach) is the local aristocrat. He tries to convince the commander to push the front so that all his enormous estate (currently divided by the frontline), falls in the Nationalist side. His "inherited" gout forbids him to walk.

Location
The film was shot mainly in Sos del Rey Católico with many locals as extras. In 2009 the village homaged the surviving artists.

References

External links

Image gallery

1985 films
1980s Spanish-language films
1980s war comedy films
Films directed by Luis García Berlanga
Spain in fiction
Spanish Civil War films
Films with screenplays by Rafael Azcona
Spanish war comedy films
1980s Spanish films